Swimming at the 2015 World Aquatics Championships was held between 2 and 9 August 2015 in Kazan, Russia. The United States won the overall medal count, led by Katie Ledecky who claimed five gold medals.

Schedule
42 events were held.

All time are local (UTC+3).

Medal summary

Medal table

Men

Women

Mixed

Records

The following world and championship records were broken during the competition.

World records

Championship records

Legend: † – en route to final mark

See also
 FINA World Swimming Championships (25 m)

References

External links
Official website

 
Swimming
Swimming at the World Aquatics Championships
World Aquatics Championships